Têwo County is a county in the south of Gansu province of the People's Republic of China, bordering Sichuan province to the south. It is under the administration of the prefecture-level city of Gannan Prefecture. Its postal code is 747400, and in 1999 its population was 55,568 people.

The Lazikou Pass, a mountain pass of strategical significance during the Long March, is located in Têwo County.

Administrative divisions
Diebu County (迭部县) is divided to 5 towns and 6 townships.
Towns

Townships

Climate

See also
 List of administrative divisions of Gansu

References

 

County-level divisions of Gansu
Gannan Tibetan Autonomous Prefecture